Mount Bethany English Medium Higher Secondary School or 
Kerala, India. The school began providing education to lower primary level classes in the late 1970s. Later the school added further classes and now serves classes from Kindergarten to 10+2 in accordance with the Kerala Syllabus.

Student body
Due to the number of commuting students, the school offers a daily school bus service with 12 buses, reaching about 75% of the district. The school offers boarding services to students from other areas of the district and state.

Academics
The school operates under the Catholic management and employs over a hundred teaching faculty. Since its start, the school offered decades of 100% passing rate in the Kerala State SSLC examination. The school instructs students by the Kerala Syllabus and the medium used is English, even though Malayalam classes are part of the curriculum. The school provides students with other classes such as Hindi, Syriac and Spoken English.

Location
The school is located in a village in Pathanamthitta district called Mylapra. As of 2001 India census, Mylapra had a population of 10241 with 4836 males and 5405 females. Mylapra is notable for having the Sacred Heart Catholic Church, which is a patron of the school. The village is the primary route to the Hindu pilgrim center of Sabarimala. The school is located in mountainous terrain by residential communities, providing the school with its calm and quiet atmosphere. The school is located at N 9 16'47.64, E 76 47' 59. 91 with an elevation of 135 ft.

Alumni
Bethanian graduates work and study in places such as the United States, Middle East, United Kingdom, Germany, South Korea, and Australia. Bethanian graduates work both in India and abroad in all professional fields including healthcare, finance, law, IT, and aeronautics. Due to the increase in social networking sites such as Orkut and Facebook, communities have been set up to bring together alumni and students.

Renovation
The school technology renovation in 2000 equipped all roof tiled classrooms with skylights, increasing the light availability in these classrooms and at the same time reducing the electricity usage to power the lighting in these classrooms. The project also unveiled fans in all classrooms, including the kindergarten classes.

The third renovation was the introduction of an intercom system, enabling live conversations between the officials and students from each classroom. All classrooms were equipped with AHUJA WS-661T/WS-664T intercom system, making the first higher secondary school in Kerala to have such system. Despite the capability of the intercom system to receive voice from the classrooms to the office, the system only provides voice from the office to the classrooms. This was due to high need of audio wires and receivers that are required to send voice from the classrooms to the office, especially in such a multi storied school with over hundred classrooms. The system is also used as an emergency alarm, as seen through its usage during the building collapse in 2005.

Incident
On 31 August 2005 the roof tiles of the secondary wing collapsed, injuring more than 20 students and 1 teacher. The incident occurred during lunch time. The three storied building was built in the 1970s, under the first construction plan of the school. The injured were taken to Muthoot Medical Centre by the school emergency officials, providing them with preliminary care. According to the police, the students suffered from minor head and back injuries and the teacher had only few bruises. The school was only shut down for two days and resumed normal classes the following Thursday.

The site was visited by MLAs Thomas Isaac, Raju Abraham and the district collector. The collapsed roof was reinstalled with modern construction materials.

Rivalry
The school competes in district and state levels in fields such as arts and sports. The school has won medals and Kalathilakams. Mount Bethany trains students from running to basketball. The school has a tournament sized basketball court, which is used for practice and tournaments. The school has a friendly rivalry with its Catholic counterpart Girideepam Bethany School in Kottayam. Basketball tournaments are held between the campuses.

School events
 Youth Festival
 Onam
 Christmas
 Annual day celebrations

Awards
MBEHSS has been awarded with the continuous 100% result producing school in SSLC and HSE Examination. Every year the school is giving awards to the toppers and special Meritorious awards to 10th and +2 toppers.

Facilities
 Air conditioned Computer Lab with Internet
 Science Lab with specimens
 Tournament sized basketball courts
 Playground
 Children's park
 Chapel
 Hostel facilities
 Multimedia projectors for functions
 Auditorium
 Inter local school bus service
 Library
 Satellite television network
 Intercom audio transferring system

Sister campus
A sister campus called Mount Bethany Public School in Kumbazha, Pathanamthitta, was built in 2003 to teach students in the CBSE syllabus. The CBSE program, started in 2001, was  conducted at the Mylapra campus. However the increasing number of applicants and facilities, to accommodate the CBSE syllabus, pressured the management to start a CBSE school in the nearby town of Kumbazha.

Notable alumni
Mythili; Malayalam film actress who debuted in the film Paleri Manikyam
Veena George; M.L.A of Aranmula constituency.
Prejish Prakash; Film editor who edited the movie Philips and the Monkey Pen etc .

References

Catholic secondary schools in India
Christian schools in Kerala
Schools in Pathanamthitta district
Educational institutions established in 1975
1975 establishments in Kerala